Orlov Most is a Sofia Metro station on M3 line. It was opened on 26 August 2020 as part of the inaugural section of the line, from Hadzhi Dimitar to Krasno Selo. The station is located between Teatralna and St. Patriarch Evtimiy. Transfer to SU St. Kliment Ohridski on M1 line is available.

Location 
The station is located near Eagles' Bridge (Orlov Most), Borisova gradina, Sofia University, and the Monument to the Soviet Army.

Transfers 
The station is connected with SU St. Kliment Ohridski Metro Station and interchanges with M1 line trains are possible.

References

Sofia Metro stations
2020 establishments in Bulgaria
Railway stations opened in 2020